Festival d'été de Québec (FEQ) is the biggest outdoor musical event in Canada. The event was held since 1968, the 11-day festival takes place every year in July. FEQ's programming includes many international stars and emerging artists from around the globe. The biggest crowd in the history of the FEQ is the Rolling Stones in 2015 with 103,000 at The Bell Stage (Plains of Abraham stage).

History
The festival has been taking place annually since 1968. The first editions were organized by a group of businesspersons and artists of Quebec City in order to show the artistic, economic, and tourist potential of the region. During the 1970s and 1980s, the festival specialized in musicians from the Francophonie and world music.

The festival grew substantially during the last decade after its decision to diversify its music offering and go after international headliners from genres across the board, including rock music, punk, hip hop, classical music, world music and electronic dance music.

The festival reached the million spectators mark for the first time in 2007 and sold-out passes for the first time in 2010.

This festival went on hiatus in 2020 due to the COVID-19 pandemic with the 53rd edition being deferred to 2021.

Since February 2022, the organization behind Festival d’été de Québec is named BLEUFEU.

Setting

The outdoor venues :
 The Bell Stage on the Plains of Abraham (Capacity 100,000)
 Parc Grande Allée (Capacity 25,000; two stages in alternation with no waiting time between sets)
 The Loto-Quebec Stage at Place George-V ( South Side )
 The SiriusXM Stage at Parc de la Francophonie ( North Side )
 The Hydro-Quebec Stage at Place d'Youville (Capacity 10,000)
 The Bell Fibe Stage at Place de L'Assemblée-Nationale (Capacity 2,000)

The indoor venue :
 The Quebec City Armoury ( Manege Militaire in French ) (for all Extra-FEQ concerts starting around midnight) (Capacity 1,000)

A site called the "Place de la famille" (Family Place) hosts animation and events for children.
Street performers are a staple of the FEQ. They can be found all over the winding streets of Old Quebec during the festival.

Main bands since 2011
 2011: Elton John, Metallica, Avenged Sevenfold, The Black Keys, Dropkick Murphys, John Fogerty, Ben Harper, Simple Plan, Hollywood Undead.
 2012: Bon Jovi, Aerosmith, Lionel Richie, LMFAO, The Offspring, Our Lady Peace, Sarah McLachlan, Skrillex, Metric, Mastodon, City and Colour.
 2013: Def Leppard, Guns N' Roses, Bruno Mars, Wu-Tang Clan, Weezer, Rush, Stevie Wonder, Foreigner, The Black Keys, Tiësto, Ellie Goulding.
 2014: Lady Gaga, Billy Joel, Journey, Bryan Adams, The Killers, Soundgarden, Snoop Dogg, Queens Of The Stone Age, Deadmau5, Cypress Hill.
 2015: The Rolling Stones, Foo Fighters, Boston, Megadeth, Keith Urban, Deep Purple, The Doobie Brothers, Jack Ü, Iggy Azalea, Milky Chance.
 2016: Rammstein, Sting, Peter Gabriel, Red Hot Chili Peppers, Duran Duran, Selena Gomez, Ice Cube, Brad Paisley, The Lumineers, The Cult.
 2017: Muse, The Who, Metallica, P!nk, Gorillaz, Kendrick Lamar, The Backstreet Boys, Lady Antebellum, Flume, Melissa Etheridge, Migos, DNCE. 
 2018: The Weeknd, Foo Fighters, Neil Young, Shawn Mendes, Beck, Lorde, Future, Dave Matthews Band, The Chainsmokers, Jethro Tull, Sum 41.
 2019: Twenty One Pilots, Mariah Carey, Slipknot, Imagine Dragons, Blink-182, Lynyrd Skynyrd, Kygo, Logic, Alt-J, Corey Hart, The Offspring, Live.
 2020: COVID-19 pandemic.
 2021: International concerts cancelled due to the COVID-19 pandemic but shows with Canadian musicians.
 2022: Rage Against the Machine, Maroon 5, Luke Combs, Alanis Morissette, Three Days Grace, Marshmello, Halsey, Jack Johnson, Luis Fonsi, Garbage.
 2023: Lineup announcement - March 22.

References

External links

 Main site

Rock festivals in Canada
Folk festivals in Canada
Classical music festivals in Canada
Tourist attractions in Quebec City
Music festivals in Quebec City
Recurring events established in 1968
Summer festivals
1968 establishments in Quebec
Music festivals established in 1968